Rasmussen syndrome is a condition characterized by multiple skin growths called trichoepitheliomas.

See also 
 List of cutaneous neoplasms associated with systemic syndromes
 List of cutaneous conditions

References 

Epidermal nevi, neoplasms, and cysts
Syndromes affecting the skin